Live at the Roxy may refer to:
Live at the Roxy (Bob Marley & The Wailers album), the posthumous live album recorded live in 1976 by Bob Marley
Live at the Roxy (Bob Welch album), a 2004 live album by ex-Fleetwood Mac singer-songwriter Bob Welch
Live at the Roxy (Eric Burdon album), a 1998 live album by Eric Burdon
Live at the Roxy (Pete Yorn album), a 2001 live album by Pete Yorn
Live at the Roxy (Social Distortion album), a 1998 live album by Social Distortion
Live at the Roxy (The Tragically Hip album), a 2022 live album by The Tragically Hip
Live at the Roxy, a 1979 live album by Van Morrison
Live at the Roxy, a 1996 live album by Michel Polnareff
Too Hot for Snakes (Live at the Roxy), a 1991 live album by Mick Taylor and Carla Olson
Live at the Roxy Theatre, a 2000 live album by Brian Wilson
Live at the Roxy 25.9.14, a 2015 live album by Slash featuring Myles Kennedy and The Conspirators